George Ricardo Codrington (26 November 1966) is a Canadian former cricketer and former ODI captain, who played in five ODIs from 17 May 2006 to 21 August 2006.

International career
On his debut, he top scored for Canada with 45 not out against Bermuda. He also appeared in the 2005 ICC Trophy in Ireland. He is a right-hand batsman and right-arm medium-fast bowler. He was made captain of the Canadian team for their matches in South Africa in late 2006 owing to the absence of usual captain John Davison.

Domestic career
After captaining Barbados in an inter-island under 21 competition in the West Indies, George Codrington first travelled to England in 1986 as part of a Viv Richards scholarship with Curtly Ambrose and Samuel Skeete. All three played in the Liverpool and District Cricket Competition, Codrington with Birkenhead Park, Ambrose with Chester Boughton Hall and Skeete with Oxton. After playing at Walsden in 1987, Codrington returned to the Liverpool and District Cricket Competition in 1988 with Chester Boughton Hall.

Coaching career
Codrington has taken a coaching position for the Canada Women's national cricket team.

References

1966 births
Living people
Canadian cricketers
Canada One Day International cricketers
Canadian cricket captains
Cricketers at the 1998 Commonwealth Games
Barbadian emigrants to Canada
Barbadian cricketers
People from Saint Michael, Barbados
Canadian cricket coaches
Barbadian cricket coaches
Black Canadian sportspeople
Commonwealth Games competitors for Canada